Woody Guthrie's Happy Joyous Hanukkah is an album by The Klezmatics, released in 2006. It contains Hanukkah-themed songs, of which the lyrics to most were written by American folk singer Woody Guthrie in 1949.

Critical reception
AllMusic wrote that the album "largely lives up to its name, stacked with uptempo, celebratory, often quite clever tributes to the festive Jewish holiday." The Sun Sentinel called the album "a fascinating project."

Track listing 
 "Honeyky Hanuka" (Guthrie/London)
 "Happy Joyous Hanuka" (Guthrie/Sklamberg)
 "Gilad and Ziv's Sirba" (Sklamberg)
 "Hanuka Bell" (Guthrie/Morrissett)
 "(Do the) Latke Flip-Flip" (London)
 "Hanukah Tree" (Guthrie/London)
 "The Many and the Few" (Guthrie)
 "Groovy's Freylekhs" (Darriau)
 "Hanuka Gelt" (Guthrie/Sklamberg)
 "Spin Dreydl Spin" (Gutkin)
 "Hanuka's Flame" (Guthrie/London)
 "Hanuka Dance" (Guthrie)

Personnel 

 Matt Darriau - reeds, Jew's harp
 Lisa Gutkin - violin, harmony vocals
 David Licht - drums
 Frank London - trumpet, harmonium, alto horn, harmony vocals
 Paul Morrissett - bass, tsimbl, baritone horn, bass vocals
 Lorin Sklamberg - lead vocals, accordion, piano
 Susan McKeown - duet vocal, "The Many and the Few"; harmony vocals, "Happy Joyous Hanuka", "Hanuka's Flame"
 Boo Reiners - guitars, banjo, mandolin
 Greg Anderson - guitar, "Hanuka Dance"; zoura, "Hanuka Gelt"; production and mixing
 Danny Blume - vocals and electric guitar, "(Do the) Latke Flip-Flip"
 Erik Anjou, Annette Ezekiel, Tine Kinderman, Klara Zikova - chorus, "Hanuka's Flame"

See also
Mermaid Avenue (1998)
Man in the Sand (1999)
Mermaid Avenue Vol. II (2000)
Wonder Wheel (2006)
The Works (2008)
New Multitudes (2012)
Mermaid Avenue: The Complete Sessions (2012)
 Secular Jewish music

References

External links
 Klezmatics official website
 Woody Guthrie official website

2006 albums
Woody Guthrie tribute albums
Hanukkah music
The Klezmatics albums